Coniophanes lateritius, the stripeless snake, is a species of snake in the family Colubridae. The species is native to Mexico.

References

Coniophanes
Snakes of North America
Reptiles described in 1862
Endemic reptiles of Mexico
Taxa named by Edward Drinker Cope